Muqrin is an Arabic name. People with the name include:

Given name
 Muqrin ibn Zamil, ruler in Eastern Arabia
 Muqrin bin Abdulaziz Al Saud (born 1945), Saudi royal

Surname/Family name
 Abdel Aziz al-Muqrin, member of Al Qaeda in the Arabian Peninsula
 Abdulaziz bin Mohammed bin Ayyaf Al Muqrin (born 1958), Saudi Arabian architect
 Al-Nu'man ibn Muqrin (died 641), companion of Muhammad
 Faisal bin Abdulaziz Al Muqrin, Saudi royal
 Muhammad bin Saud Al Muqrin (1687–1765), founder of the first Saudi state, Emirate of Diriyah 
 Saud bin Muhammad Al Muqrin (1640–1726), emir of Diriyah